Hartwig Edmund Prawitz Öberg (16 November 1930 – 4 November 1995) was a Swedish footballer and was named Swedish Football player of the year in 1962.

Born on 16 November 1930 in Gislöv, during his career he played defender, midfielder and forward. He got twenty-six caps and five goals for the national team. On club level he played for Malmö FF. He was awarded Guldbollen in 1962.

He later coached Lunds BK.

He died in Västra Skrävlinge on 4 November 1995 at the age of sixty-four.

References

External links
http://wwwc.aftonbladet.se/sport/guldbollen/1962.html

1930 births
1995 deaths
1958 FIFA World Cup players
Allsvenskan players
Malmö FF players
Sweden international footballers
Swedish footballers
Footballers from Skåne County
Swedish football managers
Lunds BK managers
Association football defenders